The 1983–84 Santosh Trophy was the 40th edition of the Santosh Trophy, the main State competition for football in India. It was held in April 1984 in Madras (now Chennai), Tamil Nadu. Goa beat Punjab 1–0 in the final to win the competition for their second time, and first as only-holders, after they held the trophy along with West Bengal in the previous edition. Arnold Rodrigues and Camilo Gonsalves (both Goa) were named the best forward and best player of the tournament respectively. The Goa side was captained by goalkeeper Brahmanand Sankhwalkar for second time.He ended the tournament with a clean sheet.

Group X

Group Y

Semi-finals

First leg

Second leg 

Surjit Singh, the goal keeper of Punjab, saved the second and third penalties.

Final

References

External links 
 Santosh Trophy 1984 at Rec.Sport.Soccer Statistics Foundation
 How Goa won the Santosh trophy in 1984

Santosh Trophy seasons
1983–84 in Indian football